Boudewijn  Maria Ignatius Büch (14 December 1948 – 23 November 2002) was a Dutch writer, poet and television presenter.

Early life
Büch was born in a Catholic family. He was born in a hospital in The Hague and spent his childhood in Wassenaar. His father was a civil servant. He and Boudewijn's mother divorced in 1963. Boudewijn had five brothers, one of them the TV-presenter Menno Buch.

Controversy 
Büch exhibited pseudologia fantastica, uttering various falsehoods about his life. Tellingly, a 2004 biography has the subtitle (translated) "Report on a mystification".

One of these lies was that he was the father of a child that had died at the age of around six. The boy he referred to did exist, but the child was not his and it did not die. This lie formed the basis of his successful novel De kleine blonde dood ("The small blond death").

Television
One of Büch's most successful television programmes was De wereld van Boudewijn Büch (VARA, summer 1988 – autumn 2001), in which he travelled all around the world to show and give his views on various places, people and phenomena.

Bibliophilia
Büch was a bibliophile, specializing in various subjects, including biology, Goethe and explorers. At his death, he possessed approximately 100,000 books. Furthermore he was very interested in islands, specifically islands that were hard to visit, like Bouvet Island near Antarctica. He wrote five non-fiction books on the subject of islands, commonly known in Dutch as the 'Islands series'.

Death
Büch was found dead in his house on Amsterdam's Keizersgracht on 23 November 2002 and is believed to have died that day at circa 2pm of a cardiac arrest. Büch was survived by his mother, five brothers and twelve nieces and nephews.

Further reading
 
 Bibliotheca didina et pinguina. The library of Boudewijn Büch. Bubb Kuyper, Haarlem, 2004-2005. [Sales catalogue in 3 volumes] Pt. 1: Natural history, medicine, sciences, travel, exploration, colonization. Pt. 2: Books about books, fine and applied arts, philosophy, literature. Pt. 3: History and travel, music varia and addenda.
 Boud. Het verzameld leven van Boudewijn Büch., Biography in Dutch by Eva Rovers November 2016.
Alex van Egmond, (2014)  Openness in Curation: The Dutch Case of Boudewijn Büch.  International Journal of Cultural and Creative Industries.

References

1948 births
2002 deaths
Book and manuscript collectors
Dutch male poets
Dutch television presenters

People from Wassenaar
20th-century Dutch poets
20th-century Dutch male writers